In computer security, the Linux Intrusion Detection System (LIDS) is a patch to the Linux kernel and associated administrative tools that enhances the kernel's security by implementing mandatory access control (MAC). When LIDS is in effect all system network administration operations, chosen file access, any capability use, raw device, memory, and I/O access can be made impossible, even for root. One can define which programs can access specific files. It uses and extends the system capabilities bounding set to control the whole system and adds some network and filesystem security features to the kernel to enhance the security. One can finely tune the security protections online, hide sensitive processes, receive security alerts through the network, and more. LIDS currently supports Linux kernel 2.6, 2.4. LIDS is released under the terms of the GNU General Public License (GPL).

Current Status 
As of 2013, the Project appears to be dead. The last updates on the homepage and in the associated forum were from 2010, and as of 2018 the website is no longer running.

Awards 
Top 75 security tools in 2003
Top 50 Security tools in 2000
Best of Linux for October 9, 2000

See also

 AppArmor
 Security-Enhanced Linux (SELinux)

References

External links
LIDS homepage (archive)

Linux security software